El Gugeton was a Ladino-language satirical journal published from Istanbul. The journal, edited by the Ladino novelist Elia Carmona, was launched after the 1908 Young Turks revolution. El Gugeton was the longest-running satirical Ladino newspaper in the city, and the second longest-running Ladino publication in the city overall after El Tiempo. The magazine folded in 1931.

References

1908 establishments in the Ottoman Empire
1931 disestablishments in Turkey
Defunct magazines published in Turkey
Jewish magazines
Judaeo-Spanish-language mass media
Jewish Turkish history
Jews and Judaism in Istanbul
Magazines established in 1908
Magazines disestablished in 1931
Magazines published in Istanbul
Sephardi Jewish culture in Turkey
Satirical magazines published in Turkey